The 1989–90 Southern Football League season was the 87th in the history of the league, an English football competition.

Dover Athletic won the Premier Division but were not promoted due to ground grading issues and a place in the Football Conference was taken by runners-up Bath City. Four bottom clubs were relegated to the Southern and Midland divisions, while champions and runners-up of lower divisions get a places in the next Premier Division season. Banbury United, Hounslow, Sandwell Borough and Sheppey United left the league.

Premier Division
The Premier Division consisted of 22 clubs, including 17 clubs from the previous season and five new clubs:
Two clubs promoted from the Midland Division:
Atherstone United
Gloucester City

Two clubs promoted from the Southern Division:
Chelmsford City
Gravesend & Northfleet

Plus:
Weymouth, relegated from the Football Conference

League table

Midland Division
The Midland Division consisted of 22 clubs, including 17 clubs from the previous season and five new clubs:
Three clubs relegated from the Premier Division:
Bedworth United
Leicester United
Redditch United

Plus:
Barry Town, transferred from the Welsh Football League
Racing Club Warwick, promoted from the Midland Football Combination

Also, at the end of the previous season Forest Green Rovers was renamed Stroud and Ashfield Hightree was renamed Sandwell Borough.

League table

Southern Division
The Southern Division consisted of 22 clubs, including 18 clubs from the previous season and four new clubs:
Bashley, promoted from the Wessex League
Fareham Town, relegated from the Premier Division
Hythe Town, promoted from the Kent League
Yate Town, promoted from the Hellenic League

Also, at the end of the previous season Thanet United reverted name to Margate.

League table

See also
Southern Football League
1989–90 Isthmian League
1989–90 Northern Premier League

References

Southern Football League seasons
6